"Rip It Up" is a 1983 single by Scottish indie pop band Orange Juice. It was the second single to be released from their 1982 album of the same name. The song became the band's only UK top 40 success, reaching no. 8 in the chart. "Rip It Up" signalled a departure from the sound of the band's earlier singles, with Chic-influenced guitars and using a synthesiser to create a more disco-oriented sound.

The song was sampled in 2009 by British soul singer Beverley Knight on her song "In Your Shoes" from the album 100%.

In 2014, NME ranked it at number 216 in its list of The 500 Greatest Songs of All Time. It was also included by Pitchfork at number 157 in a list of The Best 200 Songs of the 1980s.

Recording and influences

The song was recorded as part of the sessions for Orange Juice's second studio album and would go on to become the title track of said album.  It marked a departure from their previous guitar-pop based material, instead utilising Chic style guitar-funk and a bubbling Roland TB-303 synthesiser bassline, becoming the first chart single to feature the instrument. The song also quotes two lines of lyrics ("You know me, I'm acting dumb-dumb / You know this scene is very humdrum") and a snatch of the guitar riff from "Boredom", a song by Buzzcocks that featured on their debut Spiral Scratch EP.  The riff chimes briefly in, just as Collins namechecks the song in the lyrics claiming that "...and my favourite song is entitled 'Boredom'."  Backing vocals on the song were provided by Paul Quinn, the lead singer of fellow Scottish band Bourgie Bourgie, with whom Collins would later record a single in 1984, a cover of the Velvet Underground song "Pale Blue Eyes."

Music video
The video opens with the band in a futuristic, but cheaply constructed, control room as they sing, dance and operate various controls.  The band then watch themselves on a monitor screen as they walk down a rainy British high street dressed in incongruous, brightly coloured summer clothes.  The video then cuts back to the control room, this time with the band playing their instruments superimposed over it, before returning to more scenes of a British city in torrential rain as the band walk around in scuba diving gear.  The video finally cuts back to the band playing in a silver foil covered room, before superimposing them over a pile of random photographs.

UK single release
"Rip It Up" was released as a single in the UK in February 1983.  The seven inch vinyl version of the single was available in three versions, a double pack including a second seven-inch and a fold out poster, along with two versions of the standard release, initially with a silver injection moulded labels, and then subsequently with paper printed labels.  The song was also released on twelve inch vinyl, with extended versions of the title track and B-side.  All versions were housed in a paper sleeve depicting a US P-40 Warhawk fighter plane (decorated with eyes and teeth) partially submerged, tail first, in the sea, drawn by Edwyn Collins.

Track listing

Chart positions

References

External links

1983 singles
Orange Juice (band) songs
1983 songs
Polydor Records singles
Songs written by Edwyn Collins